Harold Mauthe (born c. 1929) was a Canadian football player who played for the Winnipeg Blue Bombers. He previously played for the Winnipeg Light Infantry.

References

1920s births
Possibly living people
American football running backs
Winnipeg Blue Bombers players